The Anacacho Limestone is a unit of limestone of Cretaceous (Campanian) age in Texas.

Description

The Anacacho Limestone is composed predominantly of limestone (wackestone, packstone, and grainstone).

Geographic Extent

Outcrops of the Anacacho Limestone are present in Kinney, Uvalde, Medina, and Bexar Counties of Texas.

Stratigraphic Setting

The Anacacho Limestone overlies the Upson Clay, and is overlain by the Corsicana Marl.

Age

The Anacacho Limestone is of Cretaceous (Campanian) age.

Interpretation of Depositional Environment

Most of the Anacacho Limestone is interpreted as having accumulated in relatively shallow (<50 m depth) marine water.

See also

 List of fossiliferous stratigraphic units in Texas
 Paleontology in Texas

References

 

Cretaceous geology of Texas